The Crispi I government of Italy held office from 29 July 1887 until 9 March 1889, a total of 589 days, or 1 year, 7 months and 8 days.

Government parties
The government was composed by the following parties:

Composition

References

Italian governments
1887 establishments in Italy